League tables for teams participating in Kakkonen, the third tier of the Finnish Soccer League system, in 2009.

League tables

Group A

Group B

Group C

Footnotes

References and sources
Finnish FA (Suomen Palloliitto - Kakkonen 2010)
Kakkonen 

Kakkonen seasons
3
Fin
Fin